KIX Country is a radio network broadcasting in various towns across Australia. Its target demographic is all people who love country music. Kix Country Radio is part of ARN. It is transmitted primarily via narrowcast stations of varying power. All bar three stations operate on the FM band.

The network is programmed out of Bundaberg, Queensland. Technical and engineering support is provided by affiliated local commercial radio stations in or near the broadcast area.

In April 2015, the Hot Country and Top Country branding was replaced by KIX, already used on stations in Queensland and South Australia.

In November 2021, KIX Country, along with other stations owned by Grant Broadcasters, were acquired by the Australian Radio Network. This deal will allow Grant's stations, including KIX Country, to access ARN's iHeartRadio platform in regional areas. The deal was finalized on January 4, 2022. The KIX Country stations in Canberra, Cooma, Goulburn, Jindabyne, and Perth owned by a 50-50 joint venture by Grant and Capital Radio Network are not part of the sale and will remain with Grant. It is unknown how the merger will impact KIX Country in regards to their branding.

Frequencies

Australian Capital Territory
 97.5FM / DAB+ Canberra

New South Wales
 88.0FM Batemans Bay
 88.0FM Bega
 87.6FM Bermagui
 1215AM Bowral
 97.5FM Canberra1
 87.6FM Cooma1
 87.6FM Eden
 100.7FM Goulburn1
 88.0FM Jindabyne1
 88.0FM Merimbula
 87.6FM Muswellbrook
 88.0FM Moruya
 97.7FM Narooma
 101.1FM Nowra
 87.8FM Pambula
 87.6FM Tamworth
 105.3FM Wollongong

Victoria
 89.3FM Geelong
 88.0FM Swan Hill

Queensland
 87.6FM 1770/Agnes Water
 100.7FM Alpha
 88.0FM Biloela
 97.5FM Blair Athol
 88.0FM Bundaberg
 97.1FM Bundaberg
 90.9FM Dysart
 88.0FM Gladstone
 92.3FM Hervey Bay
 98.1FM Inglewood
 101.9FM Injune
 88.0FM Lowood
 93.9FM Mackay
 92.3FM Maryborough
 94.1FM Middlemount
 88.0FM Moura
 92.7FM Rockhampton
 92.1FM Saraji coal mine
 94.7FM Surat
 89.9FM Townsville
 88.0FM Winton
 96.1FM Yeppoon
 89.5FM Yuleba

South Australia
 90.5FM Barossa Valley
 1557AM Berri
 87.6FM Clare
 87.6FM Port Lincoln
 87.6FM Port Pirie

Western Australia
 DAB+ Perth1
DAB+ Mandurah

Tasmania
 DAB+ Hobart
 95.3FM Queenstown

Northern Territory
 92.3FM / DAB+ Darwin

1Owned as part of a 50-50 joint venture with Grant Broadcasters and Capital Radio Network

References

External links
 KIX Country

Australian radio networks
Country radio stations in Australia
Radio stations in Canberra
Radio stations in Darwin, Northern Territory
Radio stations in Geelong
Radio stations in New South Wales
Mass media in the Hunter Region
Radio stations in Queensland
Radio stations in South Australia
Radio stations in Perth, Western Australia
Australian Radio Network
Grant Broadcasters
Capital Radio Network
Radio stations established in 2003